The Dalton Winery was founded in 1995 by members of the Haruni family who moved to Israel from England. The chief winemaker is Guy Eshel, who replaced Na'ama Sorkin in 2015. The winery releases wines under several labels, and beginning with the 2006 vintage the winery released wines under the Matatia label, destined to become the company's flagship brand, with wines released only in select vintage years as judged by the winemakers. Current production is about 850,000 bottles annually.

References

External links 
 Dalton Winery's website

Companies established in 1995
Wineries of Israel